In North Korea, the Corpse Division (시체조,屍體組) refers to a government branch responsible for the disposition of excess corpses.

References

North Korea